Jessica Pratt may refer to:

Jessica Pratt (musician) (born 1987), American folk singer-songwriter
Jessica Pratt (album), Pratt's 2012 self-titled debut album
Jessica Pratt (soprano) (born 1979), Australian operatic soprano
Jess Pratt (born 1997), Australian cyclist